John Gerard Lyons (5 December 1919 – 21 March 1955) was an Australian rules footballer who played with Essendon and North Melbourne in the Victorian Football League (VFL) during the 1940s.

Recruited locally from Essendon CYMS, Lyons played 17 of a possible 20 games in 1945, his debut season. A hard running back pocket, he polled well in Essendon's "Best and Fairest" count that season to finish runner-up to Wally Buttsworth. Despite being a regular member of the team for most of the 1946 VFL season, Lyons wasn't selected in the finals series and crossed over to North Melbourne at the end of the year.

Lyons missed just two games in his first year with North Melbourne and polled nine votes in the Brownlow Medal count, finishing as his club's second best vote getter.

He was killed in a car accident, aged 35, in 1955.

References

1919 births
Essendon Football Club players
North Melbourne Football Club players
Australian rules footballers from Melbourne
Road incident deaths in Victoria (Australia)
1955 deaths
People from Essendon, Victoria